Muristus, Miristus or Murtus was an inventor to whom two organ-like instruments are attributed. His name is mentioned in medieval Arabic sources and may refer to Ctesibius of Alexandria or another Greek writer.

See also
 Hydraulis

References

Inventors of musical instruments
Organs (music)